The Key of Truth is a text identified as a manual of either a Paulician or Tondrakian church in Armenia. Frederick Conybeare first identified the 1782 manuscript from the library of Ejmiacin in Armenia and published a translation and edition in 1898.

Conybeare claimed that the text was a servicebook of the medieval Paulicians, and it contains a rite of adult baptism with water and conscious omission of Trinitarian terminology.

There is scholarly consensus that The Key of Truth was used by sectarians with beliefs derived from the Paulicians, but scholars after Conybeare consider that these beliefs may have evolved since the Middle Ages.

References

External links
 English Translation of The Key of Truth at Archive.org

Paulicianism
Religious texts
Armenian literature
Nontrinitarianism